Omšenie is a village and municipality in Trenčín District in the Trenčín Region of north-western Slovakia.

History
In historical records, the village was first mentioned in 1332.

Geography
The municipality lies at an altitude of 322 metres and covers an area of 24.361 km². It has a population of about 1,957. The nickname of the village is "Omš"

References

External links
 
 
Statistics

Villages and municipalities in Trenčín District